Captain Robert Tait (born 23 January 1793) was a Scottish officer in the Royal Navy.

References

1793 births
19th-century deaths
Year of death missing
Royal Navy officers